The Levi Ball House is a historic house located at Berkshire in Tioga County, New York.

Description and history 
It is a transitional Federal/Greek Revival style frame house built in about 1840. The house is a two-story, five bay center hall structure. Also on the property is a contributing group of farm buildings including a late 19th-century barn with silo, a chicken house, a garage, and a small shed.

It was listed on the National Register of Historic Places on July 2, 1984.

References

Houses on the National Register of Historic Places in New York (state)
Federal architecture in New York (state)
Greek Revival houses in New York (state)
Houses completed in 1840
Houses in Tioga County, New York
Wooden houses in the United States
National Register of Historic Places in Tioga County, New York